State highway spurs in Texas are owned and maintained by the Texas Department of Transportation (TxDOT).

List
List of state highway spurs in Texas (1–99)
List of state highway spurs in Texas (100–199)
List of state highway spurs in Texas (200–299)
List of state highway spurs in Texas (300–399)
List of state highway spurs in Texas (400–499)
List of state highway spurs in Texas (500–9999)

See also
List of state highway loops in Texas

External links
Texas Department of Transportation

State Highway Spurs